Saint-Louis is a part of the village Le Mont-Dore. It is located in the extended territory of Nouméa, in France. Saint-Louis is well known for numerous violent incidents among Melanesians and Wallisians since 2002.

References 

Populated places in New Caledonia